Gisin or GISIN may refer to:
 
 Global Invasive Species Information Network
 Michelle Gisin (born 1993), Swiss alpine skier 
 Dominique Gisin (born 1985), Swiss alpine skier
 Marc Gisin (born 1988), Swiss alpine skier
 Nicolas Gisin (born 1952), Swiss physicist
 , Swiss zoologist

See also
 Gysi, a surname
 Gysin (disambiguation)